The 2021 Grand Prix de Wallonie was the 61st edition of the Grand Prix de Wallonie road cycling one day race, which was held on 14 September 2021 as part of the 2021 UCI Europe Tour and the 2021 UCI ProSeries calendars. This edition was the race's first in the UCI ProSeries; the 2020 edition was expected to feature in the inaugural UCI ProSeries but was cancelled due to the COVID-19 pandemic.

The race's hilly route covered  in Wallonia from Aywaille to Namur, and finished near the Citadel of Namur. After travelling west from the start, riders reached the outskirts of Namur and entered a local circuit after . The first passage through the finish line came after , from which point riders completed the full  circuit once. The race then conclude with a  climb up to the citadel.

After a late attack from Matis Louvel in the final kilometre was brought back, Christophe Laporte won the uphill sprint from a reduced bunch ahead of Louvel's teammate Warren Barguil, while Tosh Van der Sande finished third.

Teams 
Nine of the 19 UCI WorldTeams, seven UCI ProTeams, and four UCI Continental teams made up the twenty teams that participated in the race. In total, 135 riders started the race, of which 89 finished.

UCI WorldTeams

 
 
 
 
 
 
 
 
 

UCI ProTeams

 
 
 
 
 
 
 

UCI Continental Teams

Result

References

Sources

External links 
 

Grand Prix de Wallonie
Grand Prix de Wallonie
Grand Prix de Wallonie
Grand Prix de Wallonie